Frames Production is an Indian multifaceted production company which produces Indian soap operas, entertainment, reality shows and factual programming on Indian television. Frames is one of the top TV serial production houses in Mumbai.

Current productions

Former productions

References

External links

Companies based in Mumbai
Television production companies of India
Entertainment companies of India
Mass media companies established in 2011
2011 establishments in Maharashtra